Socovce is a village and municipality in Martin District in the Žilina Region of northern Slovakia.

History
In historical records the village was first mentioned in 1258.

Geography
The municipality lies at an altitude of 470 metres and covers an area of 5.108 km². It has a population of about 243 people.

External links
https://web.archive.org/web/20070513023228/http://www.statistics.sk/mosmis/eng/run.html

Villages and municipalities in Martin District